Excerpts From Unhappy Consciousness (Persian: ناخوشاگاه) is the third studio album by Salome MC (سالومه ), and the first full-length Hip Hop album in Iran produced by a woman. It is an autobiographical concept album that explores a woman's journey in the light of Hegel's Unhappy Consciousness, with each track correlating to a stage of dialectical life of spirit.  All songs were composed and performed by Salome MC in her home studio, and are mostly in Persian. Stylistically, the songs are a mix of Hip Hop with elements of Trip Hop, World, folk and Classical music. Salome has described the style as "what Hip Hop sounds like when a rapper lives away from urban life... It's a collection of eclectic Persian music blending urban cynicism with new-age mysticism."

Track listing

References

External links
Official website

2017 albums
Salome MC albums
Concept albums